The  (German Youth Literature Award) is an annual award established in 1956 by the Federal Ministry of Family Affairs, Senior Citizens, Women and Youth to recognise outstanding works of children's and young adult literature. It is Germany's only state-funded literary award. In the past, authors from many countries have been recognised, including non-German speakers.

Organisation 

Awards are given  in five categories: Best Picture Book, Best Children's Book, Best Youth Book, Best Non-Fiction Book and Choice of the Youth Jury. Up to six nominations in each category are announced in March at the Leipzig Book Fair, and the awards are presented during the Frankfurt Book Fair by the Federal Minister of Family Affairs, Senior Citizens, Women and Youth. In each category, the winning author receives a 10,000 euro cash prize, and a bronze statuette designed by Detlef Kraft representing Momo from the novel by Michael Ende.

Furthermore, two special awards are presented alternately to German authors, illustrators or translators. The special award for lifetime achievement is set at 12,000 Euro. The newly created special award for new talents carries a value of 10,000 Euro. Both are also financed by the Federal Ministry.

History 

Since the award was established, many changes have been made. In addition to these, a special prize was awarded every year in a different category. It was not until 1964 that the Best Picture Book and Best Non-fiction Book categories replaced this variable award. In 2017 it was supplemented by the special award for new talents to celebrate the 60th anniversary of the award..

Jury

The  decides the nominations and the majority of the prizes; the  only decides the  prize. The Sonderpreisjury awards the special awards for lifetime achievement and new talents.

The  is appointed by the  once every two years, although jury members can serve two consecutive terms. The jury consists of nine members: the chair, and eight specialist judges - two for each award category.

The  consists of the members of six German youth book clubs. It is also changed every two years, although some clubs serve consecutive terms.

The Sonderpreisjury consists of three members and changes every year.

Awards

2010–2018

2018
Winner picture book: Der siebente Bruder oder Das Herz im Marmeladenglas by Øyvind Torseter (Text, Illustration), Maike Dörries (translator)

2017

Special award for lifetime achievement: Gudrun Pausewang (author)

2016
 Picture book: Der Hund, den Nino nicht hatte by Edward van de Vendel (author), Anton van Hertbruggen (illustrator), Rolf Erdorf (translator)
 Nominees: Eine Geschichte ohne Ende by Marcelo Pimentel (illustrator). Bus fahren by Marianne Dubuc (author, illustrator), Julia Süßbrich (translator). Das Herz des Affen by Anja Mikolajetz (author, illustrator). Kako, der Schreckliche by Emmanuelle Polack (author), Barroux (illustrator), Babette Blume (translator). Der Hund, den Nino nicht hatte by Edward van de Vendel (author), Anton van Hertbruggen (illustrator), Rolf Erdorf (translator). Der goldene Käfig oder Die wahre Geschichte der Blutprinzessin by Anna Castagnoli (author), Carll Cneut (illustrator), Ulrike Schimming (translator).
 Children's book: Das Mädchen Wadjda by Hayfa Al Mansour (author), Catrin Frischer (translator)
 Nominees: Ununterbrochen schwimmt im Meer der Hinundhering hin und her - Das dicke Buch vom Nonsens-Reim von Uwe-Michael Gutzschhahn (Herausgeber), Sabine Wilharm (illustrator). Frohe Weihnachten, Zwiebelchen! von Frida Nilsson (author), Anke Kuhl (illustrator), Friederike Buchinger (translator). Das Mädchen Wadjda von Hayfa Al Mansour (author), Catrin Frischer (translator). Mein Sommer mit Mucks Stefanie Höfler (author), Franziska Walther (illustrator). Die wahre Geschichte von Regen und Sturm by Ann M. Martin (author), Gabriele Haefs (translator). Alex, Martha und die Reise ins Verbotene Land by Ross Montgomery (author), André Mumot (translator).
 Youth Book: Mädchenmeute by Kirsten Fuchs (author)
 Nominees: Halbe Helden by Erin Jade Lange (author), Jessika Komina (translator), Sandra Knuffinke (translator). Das Fieber by Makiia Lucier (author), Katharina Diestelmeier (translator). Ein Sommer am See von Mariko Tamaki (author), Jillian Tamaki (illustrator), Tina Hohl (translator). Mädchenmeute von Kirsten Fuchs (author). Eleanor & Park Rainbow Rowell (author), Brigitte Jakobeit (translator). Das hier ist kein Tagebuch by Erna Sassen (author), Rolf Erdorf (translator).
 Non-fiction book: Im Eisland by Kristina Gehrmann (author, illustrator)
 Nominees: Abc.de by Iwona Chmielewska (author, illustrator). Shackletons Reise von William Grill (author, illustrator), Harald Stadler (translator). Alle Wetter von Britta Teckentrup (author, illustrator). Leibniz oder die beste der möglichen Welten von Jean Paul Mongin (author), Julia Wauters (illustrator), Heinz Jatho (translator). Im Eisland by Kristina Gehrmann (author, illustrator). Der Traum von Olympia by Reinhard Kleist (author, illustrator).
 Preis der Jugendjury: Sommer unter schwarzen Flügeln by Peer Martin (author)
 Nominees: Du neben mir und zwischen uns die ganze Welt by Nicola Yoon (author), Simone Wiemken (translator). Sommer unter schwarzen Flügeln by Peer Martin (author). Goodbye Bellmont von Matthew Quick (author), Knut Krüger (translator). Das hier ist kein Tagebuch von Erna Sassen (author), Rolf Erdorf (translator). Der Tiger in meinem Herzen by Patricia McCormick (author), Maren Illinger (translator).
 Special award for lifetime achievement: Klaus Kordon (author)
2015
 Picture book: Herr Schnuffels von David Wiesner (author, illustrator), Paula Hagemeier (translator)
 Nominees: Gordon und Tapir von Sebastian Meschenmoser (author, illustrator); Ein Apfelbaum im Bauch von Simon Boulerice (author), Gérard DuBois (illustrator), Anna von Cramer-Klett (translator); Coco und das Kleine Schwarze von Annemarie van Haeringen (author, illustrator), Marianne Holberg (translator); Lindbergh: Die abenteuerliche Geschichte einer fliegenden Maus von Torben Kuhlmann (author, illustrator); Die Regeln des Sommers von Shaun Tan (author, illustrator), Eike Schönfeld (translator)
 Children's book: Der Träumer von Pam Muñoz Ryan (author), Peter Sís (illustrator), Anne Braun (translator)
 Nominees: Rosie und Moussa: Der Brief von Papa von Michael De Cock (author), Judith Vanistendael (illustrator), Rolf Erdorf (translator); Mein Vater, der Pirat von Davide Calì (author), Maurizio A.C. Quarello (illustrator), Edmund Jacoby (translator); Lena und das Geheimnis der blauen Hirsche von Edward van de Vendel (author), Mattias De Leeuw (illustrator), Rolf Erdorf (translator); Der Junge, der mit den Piranhas schwamm von David Almond (author), Oliver Jeffers (illustrator), Alexandra Ernst (translator); Konstantin im Wörterwald von Martin Heckmanns (author), Stefanie Harjes (illustrator).
 Youth Book: Schneeriese von Susan Kreller (author)
 Nominees: Letztendlich sind wir dem Universum egal von David Levithan (author), Martina Tichy (translator); Aristoteles und Dante entdecken die Geheimnisse des Universums von Benjamin Alire Sáenz (author), Brigitte Jakobeit (translator); Der Ernst des Lebens macht auch keinen Spaß von Christoph Wortberg (author); Jenseits der blauen Grenze von Dorit Linke (author); Die unterirdische Sonne von Friedrich Ani (author)
 Non-fiction book: Und dann platzt der Kopf von Christina Röckl (author, illustrator)
 Nominees: Kritzl & Klecks: Eine Entdeckungsreise ins Land des Zeichnens & Malens von Verena Ballhaus (author, illustrator), Renate Habinger (author, illustrator); Der Pilot und der kleine Prinz: Das Leben des Antoine de Saint-Exupéry von Peter Sís (author, illustrator), Brigitte Jakobeit (translator); Endres, der Kaufmannssohn: Vom Leben in einer mittelalterlichen Hansestadt von Anke Bär (author, illustrator); Evolution: oder Das Rätsel von allem, was lebt von Jan Paul Schutten (author), Floor Rieder (illustrator), Verena Kiefer (translator); Tagebuch 14/18 von Alexander Hogh (author), Martin Block (Herausgeber), Julie Cazier (Herausgeber), Jörg Mailliet (illustrator)
 Preis der Jugendjury: Letztendlich sind wir dem Universum egal von David Levithan (author), Martina Tichy (translator)
 Nominees: Der Circle von Dave Eggers (author), Klaus Timmermann (translator), Ulrike Wasel (translator); Auf der richtigen Seite von William Sutcliffe (author), Christiane Steen (translator); Wenn ihr uns findet von Emily Murdoch (author), Julia Walther (translator); Wo ein bisschen Zeit ist … von Emil Ostrovski (author), Thomas Gunkel (translator); Echt von Christoph Scheuring (author)
 Special award for lifetime achievement: Sabine Friedrichson (illustrator)
2014
 Picture book: Akim rennt von Claude K. Dubois (author, illustrator), Tobias Scheffel (translator)
 Nominees: Überall Linien von Jimi Lee (illustrator); Herman und Rosie: Eine Geschichte über die Freundschaft von Gus Gordon (author, illustrator), Gundula Müller-Wallraf (translator); Krümel und Pfefferminz: Wilde Tiere von Delphine Bournay (author, illustrator), Julia Süßbrich (translator); Akim rennt von Claude K. Dubois (author, illustrator), Tobias Scheffel (translator); Das literarische Kaleidoskop von Regina Kehn (Herausgeber, illustrator); Die Konferenz der Vögel von Peter Sís (author, illustrator), Brigitte Jakobeit (translator).
 Children's book: Martina Wildner, Königin des Sprungturms.
 Nominees: Besuch beim Hasen von Christian Oster (author), Katja Gehrmann (illustrator), Tobias Scheffel (translator); Der beste Tag aller Zeiten: Weitgereiste Gedichte von Susan Kreller (Herausgeber), Sabine Wilharm (illustrator), Henning Ahrens (translator), Claas Kazzer (translator); Papa, hörst du mich? von Tamara Bos (author), Annemarie van Haeringen (illustrator), Ita Maria Berger (translator); Herr und Frau Hase: Die Superdetektive von Polly Horvath (author), Sophie Blackall (illustrator), Christiane Buchner (translator); Leo und das ganze Glück von Synne Lea (author), Maike Dörries (translator);
 Youth Book: Wie ein unsichtbares Band von Inés Garland (author), Ilse Layer (translator)
 Die Sprache des Wassers von Sarah Crossan (author), Cordula Setsman (translator); 12 Things To Do Before You Crash and Burn von James Proimos (author), Uwe-Michael Gutzschhahn (translator); Über ein Mädchen von Joanne Hornimann (author), Brigitte Jakobeit (translator); Wie ein unsichtbares Band von Inés Garland (author), Ilse Layer (translator); Bo von Rainer Merkel (author); Tigermilch von Stefanie de Velasco (author).
 Non-fiction book: Gerda Gelse: Allgemeine Weisheiten über Stechmücken Heidi Trpak (author), Laura Momo Aufderhaar (illustrator)
 Der Kartoffelkönig von Christoph Niemann (author); Gerda Gelse: Allgemeine Weisheiten über Stechmücken Heidi Trpak (author), Laura Momo Aufderhaar (illustrator); Die Ton-Angeber von Anna Czerwińska-Rydel (author), Marta Ignerska (illustrator), Olaf Kühl (translator); Sommerschnee und Wurstmaschine: Sehr moderne Kunst aus aller Welt von Sebastian Cichocki (author), Aleksandra Mizielińska (illustrator), Daniel Mizielińsky (illustrator), Thomas Weiler (translator); Fräulein Esthers letzte Vorstellung von Adam Jaromir (author), Gabriela Cichowska (illustrator); Mein Opa, sein Holzbein und der Große Krieg: Was der Erste Weltkrieg mit uns zu tun hat von Nikolaus Nützel (author).
 Preis der Jugendjury: Wunder Raquel J. Palacio (author), André Mumot (translator)
 Die unglaublichen Abenteuer des Barnaby Brocket von John Boyne (author), Oliver Jeffers (illustrator), Adelheid Zöfel (translator); Wunder Raquel J. Palacio (author), André Mumot (translator); 2084 - Noras Welt von Jostein Gaarder (author), Gabriele Haefs (translator); Alles - worum es geht von Janne Teller (author), Sigrid C. Engeler (translator), Birgitt Kollmann (translator); Die Nacht gehört dem Drachen von Alexia Casale (author), Henning Ahrens (translator); Wie ein leeres Blatt von Boulet (author), Pénélope Bagieu (illustrator), Ulrich Pröfrock (translator).
 Special award for lifetime achievement: Angelika Kutsch (translator)
2013
 Picture book: Jon Klassen (author, illustrator), Wo ist mein Hut
 Nominees: Ein Entlein kann so nützlich sein von Isol (author, illustrator), Karl Rühmann (translator); Nalle liebt Oma von Stina Wirsén (author, illustrator), Maike Dörries (translator); Der Tag, an dem Louis gefressen wurde von John Fardell (author, illustrator), Bettina Münch (translator); Wo ist mein Hut von Jon Klassen (author, illustrator), Thomas Bodmer (translator); Der Rauhe Berg von Einar Turkowski (author, illustrator); Der Pirat und der Apotheker: Eine lehrreiche Geschichte von Robert Louis Stevenson (author), Henning Wagenbreth (illustrator, translator)
 Children's book: Frank Cottrell Boyce, Der unvergessene Mantel
 Nominees: Ich wünschte von Toon Tellegen (author), Ingrid Godon (illustrator), Birgit Erdmann (translator); Tommy Mütze: Eine Erzählung aus Südafrika von Jenny Robson (author), Barbara Brennwald (translator); Die wilden Piroggenpiraten: Ein tollkühnes Abenteuer um eine entführte Mohnschnecke und ihre furchtlosen Retter von Māris Putniņš (author), Matthias Knoll (translator); Zorgamazoo von Robert Paul Weston (author), Víctor Rivas (illustrator), Uwe-Michael Gutzschhahn (translator); Als mein Vater ein Busch wurde und ich meinen Namen verlor von Joke van Leeuwen (author), Hanni Ehlers (translator); Der unvergessene Mantel von Frank Cottrell Boyce (author), Salah Naoura (translator), Carl Hunter (Fotografie), Clare Heney (Fotografie)
 Youth Book: Tamta Melaschwili, Abzählen
 Nominees: MÉTO - Das Haus von Yves Grevet (author), Stephanie Singh (translator); Elefanten sieht man nicht von Susan Kreller (author); Pampa Blues von Rolf Lappert (author); Wer hat Angst vor Jasper Jones? von Craig Silvey (author), Bettina Münch (translator); Meine Schwester ist eine Mönchsrobbe von Christian Frascella (author), Annette Kopetzki (translator); Abzählen von Tamta Melaschwili (author), Natia Mikeladse-Bachsoliani (translator)
 Non-fiction book: Reinhard Kleist, Der Boxer
 Nominees: Heute bin ich von Mies van Hout (author, illustrator); Planet Willi von Birte Müller (author, illustrator); Entdecke, was dir schmeckt: Kinder erobern die Küche von Anke M. Leitzgen (author), Lisa Rienermann (illustrator, Fotografie), Thekla Ehling (Fotografie); Wilhelms Reise: Eine Auswanderergeschichte von Anke Bär (author, illustrator); Make Love: Ein Aufklärungsbuch von Ann-Marlene Henning (author), Tina Bremer-Olszweski (author), Heji Shin (Fotografie); Der Boxer: Die wahre Geschichte des Hertzko Haft von Reinhard Kleist (author, illustrator).
 Preis der Jugendjury: John Green, Das Schicksal ist ein mieser Verräter
 Nominees: Das Schicksal ist ein mieser Verräter von John Green (author), Sophie Zeitz (translator); Jackpot: Wer träumt, verliert von Stephan Knösel (author); Finding Sky: Die Macht der Seelen von Joss Stirling (author), Michaela Kolodziejcok (translator); Allein unter Schildkröten von Marit Kaldhol (author), Maike Dörries (translator); Kriegszeiten: Eine grafische Reportage über Soldaten, Politiker und Opfer in Afghanistan von David Schraven (author), Vincent Burmeister (illustrator); Adios, Nirvana von Conrad Wesselhoeft (author), Karsten Singelmann (translator).
 Special award for lifetime achievement: Andreas Steinhöfel (author)
2012
 Picture book: Pija Lindenbaum (translator: Kerstin Behnken): Mia schläft woanders
 Nominees: Yvonne Hergane (author) & Christiane Pieper (illustrator): Einer mehr; Ken Kimura (author) & Yasunari Murakami (illustrator), Hana Christen (translator): 999 Froschgeschwister ziehen um; Hildegard Müller: Der Cowboy; Pija Lindenbaum (translator: Kerstin Behnken): Mia schläft woanders; Nikolaus Heidelbach: Wenn ich groß bin, werde ich Seehund; Iwona Chmielewska (translator: Adam Jaromir): Blumkas Tagebuch. Vom Leben in Janusz Korczaks Waisenhaus
 Children's book: Finn-Ole Heinrich (author) & Rán Flygenring (illustrator): Frerk, du Zwerg!
 Nominees: Rose Lagercrantz (author), Eva Eriksson (illustrator) & Angelika Kutsch (translator): Mein glückliches Leben; Finn-Ole Heinrich (author) & Rán Flygenring (illustrator): Frerk, du Zwerg!; Salah Naoura: Matti und Sami und die drei größten Fehler des Universums; David Almond (translator: Alexandra Ernst): Mina (Ravensburger-Verlag); Patrick Ness (author), Jim Kay (illustrator) & Bettina Abarbanell (translator): Sieben Minuten nach Mitternacht; Martina Wildner: Das schaurige Haus
 Youth Book: Nils Mohl: Es war einmal Indianerland
 Nominees: Anne-Laure Bondoux (translator: Maja von Vogel): Die Zeit der Wunder; Timothée de Fombelle (translator: Tobias Scheffel und Sabine Grebing): Vango. Zwischen Himmel und Erde; Kevin Brooks (translator: Uwe-Michael Gutzschhahn): iBoy; Gabi Kreslehner: Und der Himmel rot; Nils Mohl: Es war einmal Indianerland; Els Beerten (translator: Mirjam Pressler): Als gäbe es einen Himmel
 Non-fiction book: Oscar Brenifier (author), Jacques Després (illustrator) & Norbert Bolz (translator): Was, wenn es nur so aussieht, als wäre ich da?
 Nominees: Tim Grabham, Suridh Hassan, Dave Reeve und Clare Richards (author), Garry Parsons (illustrator) & Manuela Knetsch (translator): Filmwerkstatt. So drehst du deinen eigenen Film mit Handy oder Digitalkamera; Anke M. Leitzgen (author) & Lisa Rienermann (illustrator): Erforsche deine Welt. Mit 100 Forscherfragen durchs ganze Jahr; Oscar Brenifier (author), Jacques Després (illustrator) & Norbert Bolz (translator): Was, wenn es nur so aussieht, als wäre ich da?; Heekyoung Kim (author), Krystyna Lipka-Sztarballo (illustrator) & Hans-Jürgen Zaborowski (translator): Wo geht’s lang? Karten erklären die Welt.; Fabrizio Silei (author), Maurizio A.C. Quarello (illustrator) & Sarah Pasquay (translator): Der Bus von Rosa Parks; Reinhard Osteroth (author) & Moidi Kretschmann (illustrator): Holz. Was unsere Welt zusammenhält
 Preis der Jugendjury: Patrick Ness (author), Jim Kay (illustrator) & Bettina Abarbanell (translator): Sieben Minuten nach Mitternacht
 Nominees: Patrick Ness (author), Jim Kay (illustrator) & Bettina Abarbanell (translator): Sieben Minuten nach Mitternacht; Regina Dürig: Katertag. Oder: Was sagt der Knopf bei Nacht?; Susan Vaught (translator: Ann Lecker-Chewiwi): Kopfschuss; Antonia Michaelis: Der Märchenerzähler; Tabitha Suzuma (translator: Bernadette Ott): Forbidden. Wie kann sich etwas so Falsches so richtig anfühlen?: Els Beerten (translator: Mirjam Pressler): Als gäbe es einen Himmel
 Special award for lifetime achievement: Norman Junge (illustrator)

2011

 Jugendjury:
 Nominees:
 Margos Spuren (Margo's Footsteps) by John Green (text); Sophie Zeitz (translation)
 Erebos by Ursula Poznanski
 Freak City  by Katrin Schrocke
 Nichts (Nothing) by Janne Teller (text); Sigrid C. Engeler (translation)
 Numbers by Rachel Ward (text); Uwe-Michael Gutzschhahn (translation)
 Wenn du stirbst, zieht dein ganzes Leben an dir vorbei, sagen sie (If you die, your life moves past you, they say) by Lauren Oliver (text); Katharina Meier Diestel (translation)
 Picture book:
 Nominees:
 Meine große kleine Welt (My big little world) by Marianne Dubuc (text); Anna Dove (translation)
 Das Baumhaus (The war) by Marije Tolman (illustration); Ronald Tolman (illustration);
 Oups by Jean-Luc Fromental (text); Joёlle Jolivet (illustration); Leonard Jacobson (translation)
 Die Geschichte vom Fuchs, der den Verstand verlor  by Martin Baltscheit
 Papas Arme sind ein Boot (Papa's arms are a boat) by Stein Erik Lunde (text); Øywind Torseter (illustration); Maike Dörries (translation)
 Tatu und Patu und ihre verrückten Maschinen  (Tatu and Patu and their crazy machines) by Sami Toivonen (text); Aino Havukainen (text); Elina Kritzokat (translation)
 Children's book:
 Nominees:
 Ich, Gorilla und der Affenstern (Me, Gorilla and Monkey-star) by Frida Nilsson (text); Ulf K. (illustration); Fred Buchinger (translation)
 Anton taucht ab by Milena Baisch (text); Elke Kusche (illustration)
 Der letzte unsichtbare Junge (The last invisible boy) by Evan Kuhlman (text); JP Coovert (illustration); Uwe-Michael Gutzschhahn (translation)
 Rosie und der Urgroßvater by Monika Helfer (text); Michael Köhlmeier (text); Barbara Steinitz (illustration)
 Onkel Montagues Schauergeschichten (Uncle Montague's tales of horror) by Chris Priestley (text); David Roberts (illustration); Beatrice Howeg (translation)
 Hundewinter (Dog Winter) by KA Nuzum (text); Gerda Bean (translation)
 Youth book:
 Nominees:
 Schrödinger, Dr. Linda und eine Leiche im Kühlhaus (Schrödinger, Dr. Linda and a corpse in cold storage) by Jan de Leeuw (text); Rolf Erdorf (translation)
 Tschick (Why We Took the Car) by Wolfgang Herrndorf
 Town – Irgendwo in Australien (Town – somewhere in Australia) by James Roy (text); Stefanie Schaeffler (translation)
 Zusammen allein (Together alone) by Karin Bruder
 Runaway by Oscar Huijelos (text); Günter Ohnemus (translation)
 Crank by Ellen Hopkins (text); Henning Ahrens (translation)
 Non-fiction book:
 Nominees:
 Das große Buch der Bilder und Wörter (The big book of pictures and words) by Ole Könnecke
 Alles Familie! (All family!) by Alexandra Maxeiner (text); Anke Kuhl (illustration)
 Der Junge, der Picasso biss (The boy who bit Picasso) by Antony Penrose (words); Egbert Baqué (translation)
 Zuckerpass und Blutgrätsche by Christian Eichler (text); Jürgen Rieckhoff (illustration)
 Die genialsten Erfindungen der Natur (The most ingenious inventions of nature) by Sigrid Belzer
 Von den Sternen bis zum Tau by Jens Soentgen (text); Vitali Konstantinov (illustration)

2010

 Jugendjury:
 Nominees:
 Einmal (Once) by Morris Gleitzman, 
 Chatroom-Falle by Helen Vreeswijk, 
 Tote Mädchen lügen nicht (Thirteen Reasons Why) by Jay Asher, 
 Die Tribute von Panem: Tödliche Spiele (The Hunger Games) by Suzanne Collins, 
 Unser allerbestes Jahr (The Film Club) by David Gilmour, 
 Die Einsamkeit der Primzahlen (The Solitude of Prime Numbers) by Paolo Giordano, 
 Picture book:
 Nominees:
 Johanna im Zug by Kathrin Schärer, 
 Wenn ich das 7. Geißlein wär´ by Karla Schneider (text) and Stefanie Harjes (illustration), 
 Gedicht für einen Goldfisch by Jean-Pierre Siméon (text) and Olivier Tallec (illustration), 
 Garmans Sommer by Stian Hole, 
 An Großvaters Hand: Meine Kindheit in China by Chen Jianghong, 
 Um Mitternacht by Eduard Mörike (text) and Hannes Binder (illustration), 
 Children's book:
 Nominees:
 Die Bibel: Das Alte Testament by Sybil Gräfin Schönfeldt (text) and Klaus Ensikat (illustration), 
 Timur und die Erfindungen aus lauter Liebe by Marlies Bardeli (text) and Anke Kuhl (illustration), 
 Meine Mutter ist in Amerika und hat Buffalo Bill getroffen by Jean Regnaud (text), Émile Bravo (illustration) and Michael Hau (Organisation), 
 Das Mädchen mit den drei Namen by Tami Shem-Tov, 
 Warten auf Anya (Waiting for Anya) by Michael Morpurgo, 
 Ihr kriegt mich nicht by Mikael Engström, 
 Youth book:
 Nominees:
 Nathan und seine Kinder by Mirjam Pressler, 
 Klick! Zehn Autoren erzählen einen Roman (Click) by David Almond, Eoin Colfer, Roddy Doyle, Deborah Ellis, Nick Hornby, Gregory Maguire, Margo Lanagan, Ruth Ozeki, Linda Sue Park and Tim Wynne-Jones, 
 Such dir was aus, aber beeil dich! Kindsein in zehn Kapiteln by Nadia Budde, 
 Zweiunddieselbe: "Wie viel von mir bin ich?" by Mary E. Pearson, 
 Rotkäppchen muss weinen by Beate Teresa Hanika, 
 Die Karte meiner Träume (The Selected Works of T.S. Spivet) by Reif Larsen, 
 Non-fiction book:
 Nominees:
 Achtung, fertig, Baustelle! Wie ein Haus geplant und gebaut wird by Rolf Toyka (text), Ferenc B. Regös (illustration) and Heike Ossenkop (Organisation, Photography), 
 Kuckuck, Krake, Kakerlake: Das etwas andere Tierbuch by Bibi Dumon Tak (text) and Fleur van der Weel (illustration), 
 drüben! by Simon Schwartz, 
 Mutige Menschen: Widerstand im dritten Reich by Christian Nürnberger, 
 Kanzler lieben Gummistiefel: So funktioniert Politik by Marietta Slomka and Daniel Westland, 
 Die nächste GENeration: Science + Fiction by Charlotte Kerner (text and Editing), Claudia Eberhard-Metzger (text) and Susanne Paulsen (text),

2000–2009

2009

 Jugendjury: Die Bücherdiebin (The Book Thief) by Markus Zusak, 
 Nominees:
 Wie man unsterblich wird (Ways to Live Forever) by Sally Nicholls, 
 Wie ich zum besten Schlagzeuger der Welt wurde – und warum (Drums, Girls, and Dangerous Pie) by Jordan Sonnenblick, 
 Anas Geschichte (Ana's Story) by Jenna Bush (text) und Mia Baxter (photography), 
 Die Nackten by Iva Procházková, 
 Ich, Adrian Mayfield by Floortje Zwigtman, 
 Picture book: Geschichten aus der Vorstadt des Universums (Tales From Outer Suburbia) by Shaun Tan, 
 Nominees:
 Leute by Blexbolex, 
 Was tun!? by Dieter Böge (text) und Bernd Mölck-Tassel (illustration), 
 Räuberkinder by Antje Damm, 
 Das Kinder-Verwirr-Buch by Norman Junge (illustration) und Joachim Ringelnatz (text), 
 Ein neues Land (The Arrival) by Shaun Tan, 
 Children's book: Rico, Oskar und die Tieferschatten by Andreas Steinhöfel (text) and Peter Schössow (illustration), 
 Nominees:
 Alabama Moon by Watt Key, 
 Mut für Drei by Bart Moeyaert (text) and Rotraut Susanne Berner (illustration), 
 Rabenhaar by Do van Ranst, 
 Tote Maus für Papas Leben by Marjolijn Hof, 
 Die Entdeckung des Hugo Cabret (The Invention of Hugo Cabret) by Brian Selznick, 
 Youth book: The Road of the Dead (The Road of the Dead) by Kevin Brooks, 
 Nominees:
 Wintereis by Peter van Gestel, 
 Verkauft (Sold) by Patricia McCormick, 
 Nach dem Unglück schwang ich mich auf, breitet meine Flügel aus und flog davon (After the Wreck, I Picked Myself Up, Spread My Wings, and Flew Away) by Joyce Carol Oates, 
 Die Nackten by Iva Procházková, 
 Scherbenpark by Alina Bronsky, 
 Non-fiction book: Das Rätsel der Varusschlacht by Wolfgang Korn (text) und Klaus Ensikat (illustration), 
 Nominees:
 Was ist da passiert? by Béatrice Vincent (text) und Bruno Heitz (illustration), 
 Geheime Welt der Raupen by Monika Lange (text) und Ingo Arndt (Photos), 
 So leben wir. Menschen am Rande der Megacitys (The Places We Live) by Jonas Bendiksen, 
 Der Traum vom Fliegen by Susanna Partsch and Rosemarie Zacher, 
 Special prize for Illustration: Jutta Bauer

2008

 Jugendjury: Simpel (Simple) by Marie-Aude Murail, 
 Nominees:
 Running Man (The Running Man) by Michael Gerard Bauer, 
 Der Junge im gestreiften Pyjama (The Boy in the Striped Pyjamas) by John Boyne, 
 Eine wie Alaska (Looking for Alaska) by John Green, 
 Die Minute der Wahrheit. Roman über die Liebe und die Kunst by Bjørn Sortland, 
 Nick & Norah. Soundtrack einer Nacht (Nick and Norah's Infinite Playlist) by Rachel Cohn, David Levithan, 
 Picture book: Hänsel und Gretel by Jacob und Wilhelm Grimm (text), Susanne Janssen (illustration), 
 Nominees:
 Alle seine Entlein by Christian Duda (text), Julia Friese (illustration), 
 Wann kommt Mama? (Waiting For Mama) by Lee Tae-Jun (text), Kim Dong-Seong (illustration), Andreas Schirmer (translation), 
 Ente, Tod und Tulpe (Duck, Death and the Tulip) by Wolf Erlbruch, 
 Der weiße und der schwarze Bär by Jürg Schubiger (text), Eva Muggenthaler (illustration), 
 5 Songs by Gipi, 
 Children's book: Ein Bild von Ivan (Portrait of Ivan) by Paula Fox, 
 Nominees:
 Die schlaue Mama Sambona by Hermann Schulz (text), Tobias Krejtschi (illustration), 
 Zarah. Du hast doch keine Angst, oder? by Zoran Drvenkar (text), Martin Baltscheit (illustration), 
 Big (Piggy) by Mireille Geus, 
 Das Gegenteil von Sorgen by Benny Lindelauf, 
 KIRA-KIRA (Kira-Kira) by Cynthia Kadohata, 
 Youth book: was wäre wenn (Just in Case) by Meg Rosoff, 
 Nominees:
 Eine wie Alaska (Looking for Alaska) by John Green, 
 Kissing the Rain by Kevin Brooks, 
 Dann tu's doch by Andreas Schendel, 
 Superhero (Death of a Superhero) by Anthony McCarten, 
 Ein Sommer in Venedig by Włodzimierz Odojewski, 
 Non-fiction book: Der Kick. Ein Lehrstück über Gewalt by Andres Veiel, 
 Nominees:
 1 roter Punkt (One Red Dot) by David A. Carter, 
 Pole, Packeis, Pinguine. Leben im ewigen Eis by Karoline Stürmer (text), Doris Katharina Künster (Arrangement), 
 Sprache oder Was den Mensch zum Menschen macht by Nikolaus Nützel, 
 Rotes Land Gelber Fluss. Eine Geschichte aus der chinesischen Kulturrevolution (Red Land, Yellow River: A Story From the Cultural Revolution) by Ange Zhang, 
 Ich war das Kind von Holocaustüberlebenden (I Was a Child of Holocaust Survivors) by Bernice Eisenstein, 
 Special prize for Translation: Gabriele Haefs

2007
Source:
 Jugendjury:  Der Joker (The Messenger) by Markus Zusak (Author), Alexandra Ernst (translation), 
 Nominees:
 Die fünf Tore – Todeskreis (Raven's Gate) by Anthony Horowitz, 
 Bis(s) zum Morgengrauen (Twilight) by Stephenie Meyer, 
 Keeper (Keeper) by Mal Peet, 
 Leihst du mir deinen Blick? Eine E-Mail Freundschaft zwischen Jerusalem und Gaza (Message in a Bottle) by Valérie Zenatti, 
 Zwei Wege in den Sommer by Robert Habeck and Andrea Paluch, 
 Picture book:  Königin Gisela (Where the Girls Are) by Nikolaus Heidelbach, 
 Nominees:
 Die Torte ist weg! (Where is the cake?) by Thé Tjong-Khing, 
 Krawinkel & Eckstein by Wouter van Reek, 
 Der kleine Häwelmann (Little Hobbin) by Theodor Storm (text), Henriette Sauvant (illustration), 
 Herr Eichhorn und der Mond (Mr Squirrel and the Moon) by Sebastian Meschenmoser, 
 Pikko, die Hexe by Toon Tellegen (text), Marit Törnqvist (illustration), From the Dutch by Mirjam Pressler, 
 Children's book:  Schwester by Jon Fosse (text), Aljoscha Blau (illustration), Hinrich Schmidt-Henkel (translation), 
 Nominees:
 Die besten Beerdigungen der Welt (All The Dear Little Animals) by Ulf Nilsson (text), Eva Eriksson (illustration), 
 Ein Zwilling für Leo by Sébastien Joanniez (text), Régis Lejonc (illustration), 
 Steppenwind und Adlerflügel by Xavier-Laurent Petit, 
 Das Buch von allen Dingen (The Book of Everything) by Guus Kuijer, 
 Samuraisommer by Åke Edwardson, 
 Youth book:  Wir retten Leben, sagt mein Vater by Do van Ranst (Author), Andrea Kluitmann (translation), 
 Nominees:
 Meisterwerk (Framed) by Frank Cottrell Boyce, 
 Wenn er kommt, dann laufen wir (Dark Angel) by David Klass, 
 Paradiesische Aussichten (Just Like Tomorrow) by Faïza Guène, 
 Ein reiner Schrei (A Swift Pure Cry) by Siobhan Dowd, 
 Liebeslinien by Marjaleena Lembcke, 
 Non-fiction book:  Mutter hat Krebs (Mom's Cancer) by Brian Fies (Author), Wolfgang J. Fuchs (translation), 
 Nominees:
 Was macht der Bär im Museum? by Claire d'Harcourt, 
 Mount Everest by Maja Nielsen and Jochen Hemmleb, 
 Wolfgang Amadé Mozart by Barbara Mungengast (concept and design), Sigrid Laube (text), Nadia Budde (illustration), 
 Petr Ginz. Prager Tagebuch 1941-1942 (The Diary of Petr Ginz) by Chava Pressburger, 
 Geschichte der Elektrizität by Henning Boëtius, 
 Special prize for Writing: Kirsten Boie

2006

 Young People's Prize: Lucas by Kevin Brooks/ Uwe-Michael Gutzschhahn (translation), 
 Nominees:
 Whisper by Isabel Abedi, 
 was geht wenn du bleibst by Zoran Drvenkar, 
 Eve Green (Eve Green) by Susan Fletcher, 
 Mit offenen Augen. Die Geschichte von Freaky Green Eyes (Freaky Green Eyes) by Joyce Carol Oates, 
 Septimus Heap. Magyk (Magyk) by Angie Sage, 
 Picture book: Gehört das so??! Die Geschichte von Elvis by Peter Schössow, 
 Nominees:
 Zwei Schwestern bekommen Besuch (The Visitor) by Sonja Bougaeva, 
 Die Wölfe in den Wänden (The Wolves in the Walls) by Neil Gaiman (text) and Dave McKean (illustration), 
 Rote Wangen by Heinz Janisch (text) and Aljoscha Blau (illustration), 
 Gesichter (Faces) by François und Jean Robert, 
 Children's book: Lilis Leben eben (That's Life, Lily) by Valérie Dayre/ Maja von Vogel (translation), 
 Nominees:
 Besuche bei Charles by Vincent Cuvellier (text) and Charles Dutertre (illustration), 
 Weißnich by Joke van Leeuwen, 
 Ein glücklicher Zufall und andere Kindergeschichten by Ljudmila Ulitzkaja (text) and Wolf Erlbruch (illustration), 
 SoB.It: Heidis Geschichte (So B. It) by Sarah Weeks, 
 Youth book: Wie schön weiß ich bin by Dolf Verroen/ Rolf Erdorf (translation), 
 Nominees:
 Feuerschlucker (The Fire-Eaters) by David Almond, 
 Ich bin Amerika (America) by E.R. Frank, 
 Evil. Das Böse (Ondskan) by Jan Guillou, 
 Die Nacht, als Mats nicht heimkam by Martha Heesen, 
 So lebe ich jetzt (How I Live Now) by Meg Rosoff, 
 Non-fiction book: 'Denk nicht, wir bleiben hier!' – Die Lebensgeschichte des Sinto Hugo Höllenreiner by Anja Tuckermann, 
Nominees:
 Jasper schafft Platz by Martin Bertelsen (text) and Hartmut Kozok (illustration), 
 Das Buch vom Müssen und Machen (Poop: A Natural History of the Unmentionable) by Nicola Davies (text) and Neal Layton (illustration), 
 Das große Familienbuch der Feste und Bräuche by Christa Holtei (text) and Tilman Michalski (illustration), 
 Die Welt der Vögel für Kinder erzählt (Birds) by Gilles Martin (Photos), Jean Chevallier (illustration), Philippe J. Dubois and Valérie Guidoux (text), 
 Special prize for Illustration: Rotraut Susanne Berner

2005

 Young People's Prize: Im Schatten der Wächter (Inventing Elliot) by Graham Gardner/ Alexandra Ernst (translation), 
 Nominees:
 In meiner Haut (Out of the Fire) by Deborah Froese, 
 Kafka am Strand (Kafka on the Shore) by Haruki Murakami, 
 Ein Meer dazwischen, eine Welt entfernt (An ocean apart, a world away) by Lensey Namioka, 
 Asphalt Tribe: Kinder der Straße (Asphalt Tribe) by Morton Rhue, 
 Lilly unter den Linden by Anne C. Voorhoeve, 
 Picture book: Han Gan und das Wunderpferd by Chen Jianghong, 
 Nominees:
 Der Zapperdockel und der Wock by Georg Bydlinski (text) and Jens Rassmus (illustration), 
 Die große Frage (The Big Question) by Wolf Erlbruch, 
 Meeres Stille und Glückliche Fahrt by Johann Wolfgang von Goethe (text) and Peter Schössow (illustration), 
 Brundibar (Brundibár) by Tony Kushner (text) and Maurice Sendak (illustration), 
 Echte Kerle (Boys Are Best!) by Manuela Olten, 
 Children's book: Die Kurzhosengang by Viktor Caspak and Yves Lanois/ Andreas Steinhöfel (translation) and Ole Könnecke (illustration), 
 Nominees:
 Despereaux (The Tale of Despereaux) by Kate DiCamillo (text) and Timothy Basil Ering (illustration), 
 35 Kilo Hoffnung (95 pounds of Hope) by Anna Gavalda, 
 Die furchtbar hartnäckigen Gapper von Frip (The Very Persistent Gappers of Frip) by George Saunders (text) and Lane Smith (illustration), 
 Bartimäus: Das Amulett von Samarkand (The Amulet of Samarkand) by Jonathan Stroud, 
 Was ich vergessen habe by Edward van de Vendel, 
 Youth book: Schneeweiß und Russenrot (Snow White and Russian Red) by Dorota Masłowska, 
 Nominees:
 Busfahrt mit Kuhn by Tamara Bach, 
 Martyn Pig (Martyn Pig) by Kevin Brooks, 
 Doing it (Doing It) by Melvin Burgess, 
 Monsterwochen (Stoner and Spaz) by Ron Koertge, 
 Lauf, Junge, lauf (Run, boy, run) by Uri Orlev, 
 Non-fiction book: Nester bauen, Höhlen knabbern by Anne Möller, 
 Nominees:
 Nano?! Die Technik des 21. Jahrhunderts by Niels Boeing, 
 Sternenflug und Sonnenfeuer: Drei Astronominnen und ihre Lebensgeschichten by Charlotte Kerner (text & Publisher), Claudia Eberhard-Metzger (text) and Renate Ries (text)
 Das Buch von der Zukunft: Ein Reiseführer by Andreas Eschbach, 
 Warum? (Why?) by Lila Prap, 
 Der Baum des Lebens (The Tree of Life) by Peter Sís, 
 Special prize for Translation: Harry Rowohlt

2004

 Young People's Prize: Das Schwert in der Stille (Across the Nightingale Floor) by Lian Hearn, 
 Nominees:
 Höhenflug abwärts by Jana Frey, 
 Tintenherz (Inkheart) by Cornelia Funke, 
 Das Orangenmädchen (The Orange Girl) by Jostein Gaarder, 
 Sie hatten einen Traum by Thomas Jeier, 
 Harry Potter und der Orden des Phönix (Harry Potter and the Order of the Phoenix) by J. K. Rowling, 
 Picture book: Fuchs (Fox) by Margaret Wild (text) and Ron Brooks (illustration), 
 Nominees:
 Du schon wieder by Zoran Drvenkar (text) and Ole Könnecke (illustration), 
 Nelson, der Käpt'n und ich by Katja Gehrmann, 
 Der hölzerne Mann by Melanie Kemmler, 
 Kwatsch (Baloney (Henry P.)) by Jon Scieszka (text) and Lane Smith (illustration), 
 Einer, der nichts merkte by Robert Walser (text) and Käthi Bhend (illustration), 
 Children's book: Ein Schaf fürs Leben by Maritgen Matter (text) and Anke Faust (illustration), 
 Nominees:
 Neun nackte Nilpferddamen by Gerda Anger-Schmidt (text) and Renate Habinger (illustration), 
 Der beste Hund der Welt (Love That Dog) by Sharon Creech (text) and Rotraut Susanne Berner (illustration), 
 Die Busfahrerin by Vincent Cuvellier (text) and Candice Hayat (illustration), 
 Tintenherz (Inkheart) by Cornelia Funke, 
 Ein rotes Herz, ein blauer Schmetterling by Annika Thor, 
 Youth book: Marsmädchen (Girl From Mars) by Tamara Bach
 Nominees:
 Brando by Mikael Engström, 
 Der Drachenflieger (The Kite Rider) by Geraldine McCaughrean, 
 Die Braut meines Bruders (Bride on Paper) by Nava Semel, 
 Mimus (Mimus) by Lilli Thal, 
 Jinx (Jinx) by Margaret Wild, 
 Non-fiction book: Lieber wütend als traurig. Die Lebensgeschichte der Ulrike Marie Meinhof by Alois Prinz, 
 Nominees:
 Christophs Experimente by Christoph Biemann (text) and Hildegard Müller (illustration / layout), 
 Die Kinder-Uni: Forscher erklären die Rätsel der Welt by Ulrich Janßen / Ulla Steuernagel (text) and Klaus Ensikat (illustration), 
 Denk dir die Welt: Philosophie für Kinder by Brigitte Labbé / Michel Puech (text) and Jaques Azam (illustration), 
 Der Mikrokosmos für Kinder erklärt by Oliver Meckes and Nicole Ottawa, 
 Selbstdenken! 20 Praktiken der Philosophie by Jens Soentgen (text) and Nadia Budde (illustration), 
 Special prize for Writing: Benno Pludra

2003

 Young People's Prize: Krokodil im Nacken by Klaus Kordon, 
 Nominees:
 Eine für vier (Sisterhood of the Traveling Pants) by Ann Brashares, 
 Sag mir, was du siehst by Zoran Drvenkar, 
 RaumZeit by Christian Linker, 
 Lab 47: Gefahr aus dem Labor (Bloodline) by Malcolm Rose, 
 Ohrensausen by Jochen Till, 
 Picture book: Unsichtbar (Invisible) by Katja Kamm, 
 Nominees:
 Mitten in der Nacht by Bruno Blume (text) and Jacky Gleich (illustration), 
 Nein! Tomaten ess ich nicht! (I Will Not Ever Never Eat a Tomato) by Lauren Child, 
 Das Notizbuch des Zeichners by Mohieddin Ellabbad, 
 Die Schöpfung by Friedrich Karl Waechter, 
 Die drei Schweine (The Three Pigs) by David Wiesner, 
 Children's book: Schlimmes Ende (Awful End)by Philip Ardagh, 
 Nominees:
 So was macht die Liebe by Bo R. Holmberg, 
 Salamander im Netz by Elizabeth Honey (text) and Jörg Mühle (illustration), 
 Wenn dich ein Löwe nach der Uhrzeit fragt: Eine Afrikageschichte by Hermann Schulz, 
 Esperanza by Jakob Wegelius, 
 Die fabelhaften Barker Girls (Double Act) by Jacqueline Wilson (text) and Susann Opel-Götz (illustration), 
 Youth book: Prinz William, Maximilian Minsky und ich (Prince William, Maximillian Minsky and me) by Holly-Jane Rahlens, 
 Nominees:
 Hathaway Jones by Katja Behrens, 
 Was wisst ihr denn schon (The Facts Speak For Themselves) by Brock Cole, 
 Und wenn schon! by Karen-Susan Fessel, 
 Das Rätsel des Feuers (Playing With Fire) by Henning Mankell, 
 Prinz Faisals Ring (The Ring of the Slave Prince) by Bjarne Reuter, 
 Non-fiction book: Geschichte der Wirtschaft by Nikolaus Piper
 Nominees:
 Die Geschichte der Titanic by Eric Kentley (text) and Steve Noon (illustration), 
 Philosophie: Abenteuer Denken by Stephen Law (text) and Daniel Postgate (illustration), 
 Weltgeschichte by Manfred Mai, 
 Sag mir, wie ist Afrika? by Marie Sellier (text) and Marion Lesage (illustration), 
 Die Leute von Birka: So lebten die Wikinger by Mats Wahl (text), Björn Ambrosiani (text) and Sven Nordqvist (illustration), 
 Special prize for Illustration: Wolf Erlbruch

2002

 Picture book: Die ganze Welt (A Whole World) by Katy Couprie and Antonin Louchard, 
 Nominees:
 Opas Engel (Grandpa's Angel) by Jutta Bauer, 
 Rotkäppchen by the Brothers Grimm (text) and Susanna Janssen (illustration), 
 Schwi-Schwa-Schweinehund by Karoline Kehr, 
 Der Tag an dem Marie ein Ungeheuer war by Lotte Kinskofer (text) and Verena Ballhaus (illustration), 
 Mama ist groß wie ein Turm by Brigitte Schär (text) and Jacky Gleich (illustration), 
 Children's book: Wir alle für immer zusammen by Guus Kuijer, illustrated by Alice Hoogstad, 
 Nominees:
 War mal ein Lama in Alabama by Irmela Brender (text) and Verena Ballhaus (illustration), 
 Der einzige Vogel, der die Kälte nicht fürchtet by Zoran Drvenkar (text) and Martin Baltscheit (illustration), 
 Winn-Dixie (Because of Winn-Dixie) by Kate DiCamillo (Author) and Sabine Ludwig (translation), 
 Paul ohne Jacob (Radiance Descending) by Paula Fox (Author) and Cornelia Krutz-Arnold (translation), 
 Mein Großvater war ein Kirschbaum by Angela Nanetti (text), Józef Wilkon (illustration) and Rosemarie Griebel-Kruip (translation), 
 Youth book: Ich habe einfach Glück by Alexa Hennig von Lange, 
 Nominees:
 Wir Goonyas, ihr Nungas (Deadly, Unna?) by Phillip Gwynne (Author), Cornelia Krutz-Arnold (translation), 
 Malka Mai by Mirjam Pressler, 
 Falsch gedacht by Sigurd Pruetz, 
 Defender: Geschichten aus der Mitte der Welt by Andreas Steinhöfel, 
 Der Unsichtbare (Den osynlige) by Mats Wahl (Author) and Angelika Kutsch (translation), 
 Non-fiction book: Das visuelle Lexikon der Umwelt by Bernd Schuh, 
 Nominees:
 Als Deutschland am Äquator lag: Eine Reise in die Urgeschichte by Volker Arzt (text) and Knud Jaspersen (illustration), 
 Mensch & Co.:Aufregende Geschichten von Lebewesen, die auf uns wohnen by Jörg Blech (text) and Antje von Stemm (illustration), 
 Die Geschichte der Juden by Lutz van Dijk (text) and Renate Schlicht (illustration), 
 Wörterwerkstatt: Tipps für Jugendliche, die gern schreiben by Sylvia Englert (text) and Stefanie Scharnberg (illustration), 
 Der Mann mit der Zwitschermaschine by Mario Giordano, 
 Special prize for Translation: Cornelia Krutz-Arnold

2001

 Picture book: Schreimutter by Jutta Bauer, 
 Nominees:
 Otto Karotto by Chiara Carrer (Author),  Dorothea Löcker and Alexander Potyka (translation), 
 Pozor by Anna Maar (text) and Bernd Mölck-Tassel (illustration), 
 Die Prinzessin kommt um vier: Eine Liebesgeschichte by Wolfdietrich Schnurre (text) and Rotraut Susanne Berner (illustration), 
 Steinsuppe by Anaïs Vaugelade (Author) and Tobias Scheffel (translation), 
 Children's book: Der Tag, als ich lernte die Spinnen zu zähmen by Jutta Richter, 
 Nominees:
 Der Mann mit der Maske (Angel Square) by Brian Doyle (Author) and Sylke Hachmeister (translation), 
 Herr der Diebe (The Thief Lord) by Cornelia Funke, 
 Großer Ozean: Gedichte für alle by Hans-Joachim Gelberg (Editor), 
 Reise gegen den Wind by Peter Härtling, 
 Kamos gesammelte Abenteuer by Daniel Pennac (Author) and Wolfgang Rentz (translation), 
 Youth book: Die ohne Segen sind (The Lesser Blessed) by Richard van Camp, 
 Nominees:
 Ulla und alles by Kim Fupz Aakeson (Author) and Christel Hildebrandt (translation), 
 Im Regen stehen by Zoran Drvenkar, 
 Löcher: Die Geheimnisse von Green Lake (Holes) by Louis Sachar (Author) and Birgitt Kollmann (translation), 
 Sonnennebel by Hermann Schulz, 
 East End, West End und dazwischen Maniac Magee (Maniac Magee) by Jerry Spinelli (Author) and Andreas Steinhöfel (translation), 
 Non-fiction book: Sonnenfresser. Wie Pflanzen leben by Susanne Paulsen, 
 Nominees:
 Erzählt es euren Kindern: Der Holocaust in Europa by Stéphane Bruchfeld, Paul A. Levine (Authors), Uwe Danker (Editor) and Robert Bohn (translation), 
 Abenteuer Zukunft: Projekte und Visionen für das dritte Jahrtausend by Eirik Newth (Author) and Ina Kronenberger (translation), 
 "Und jedem Anfang wohnt ein Zauber inne": Die Lebensgeschichte des Hermann Hesse by Alois Prinz, 
 Und was kommt dann?: Das Kinderbuch vom Tod by Pernilla Stalfelt (Author) and Birgitta Kicherer (translation), 
 Das unendliche Reich der Sterne: Die faszinierende Welt der Astronomie by Jürgen Teichmann (text) and Christof Gießler (illustration), 
 Special prize for Writing: Peter Härtling

2000

 Picture book: Eins zwei drei Tier (One Two Three Me) by Nadia Budde, 
 Nominees:
 Flieg, Ente, flieg! (Sitting Ducks) by Michael Bedard (Author) and Mirjam Pressler (translation), 
 Nachts by Wolf Erlbruch, 
 Wach doch auf! by Jan Jutta (Author) and Andrea Kluitmann (translation), 
 Waas! (What!) by Kate Lum (text), Adrian Johnson (illustration) and Thomas Minssen (translation), 
 Affenzoff by John A. Rowe, 
 Children's book: Hodder der Nachtschwärmer by Bjarne Reuter, 
 Nominees:
 Nicht Chicago. Nicht hier. by Kirsten Boie, 
 Der unsichtbare Vater by Amelie Fried (text) and Jacky Gleich (illustration), 
 Viegelchen will fliegen by Joke van Leeuwen (Author) and Hanni Ehlers (translation), 
 Jakob heimatlos by Benno Plundra, 
 Anna und die Sache mit der Liebe by Kaat Vrancken (text), Rotraut Susanne Berner (illustration) and Silke Schmidt (translation), 
 Youth book: Blueprint by Charlotte Kerner, 
 Nominees:
 So ein alberner Satz wie: Ich liebe dich by Martin Casariego Córdoba (Author) and Katrin Fieber (translation), 
 Ti by Henri van Daele (Author), Jeanne Oidtmann-van Beek und Peter Oidtmann (translation), 
 Victor: Roman über den Wolfsjungen aus dem Aveyron (Victor: A Novel Based on the Life of the Savage of Averyon) by Mordicai Gerstein (Author) and Bettine Braun (translation), 
 Tanz auf dünnem Eis by Pernilla Glaser (Author) and Birgitta Kicherer (translation), 
 Das Mädchen am Kanal by Thierry Lenain (Author) and Anne Braun (translation), 
 Non-fiction book: Fräulein Pop und Mrs. Up und ihre große Reise durchs Papierland. Ein Pop-up-Buch zum Selberbasteln by Antje von Stemm, 
 Nominees:
 Young Oxford Urgeschichte by Jill Bailey, Tony Seddon (Authors) and Cäcilie Plieninger (translation), 
 Wer regt sich hier so auf? Eine kleine Völkerkunde für Kinder by Pascale Bougeault (Author), Markus Weber und Sabine Meyer-Bachem (translation), 
 Wie die Häuser in den Himmel wuchsen: Die Geschichte des Bauens by Susanna Partsch, 
 Hauptsache Köpfchen! Was unser Gehirn alles kann by Pete Rowan (text), John Temperton (illustration) and Monika Lange (translation), 
 Ich und ein Baby? by Christine Wolfrum, 
 Special Prize for Illustration: Nikolaus Heidelbach

1990–1999

1999
 Picture book: Der rote Wolf by F. K. Waechter, 
 Children's book: Eine Insel im Meer (A Faraway Island) by Annika Thor, 
 Youth book: Bruder (Brothers) by Ted van Lieshout, 
 Non-fiction book: Tibet. Das Geheimnis der roten Schachtel (Tibet through the Red Box) by Peter Sís, 
 Special prize for Translation: Birgitta Kicherer

1998
 Picture book: Hat Opa einen Anzug an? (Is Grandpa Wearing a Suit?) by Amelie Fried (text), Jacky Gleich (illustration), 
 Children's book: Zwischen zwei Scheiben Gluck (Between Two Seasons of Happiness) by Irene Dische, 
 Youth book: Bloße Hände (Bare Hands) by Bart Moeyaert (text), Rotraut Susanne Berner (illustration), 
 Non-fiction book: Haus der Kunst by Susanna Partsch, 
 Special Prize for Writing: Peter Hacks

1997
 Picture book: Du groß, und ich klein by Grégoire Solotareff, 
 Children's book: Karel, Jarda und das wahre Leben by Sheila Och, 
 Youth Book: So Lonely by Per Nilsson, 
 Non-fiction book: Königskinder. Eine wahre Liebe (Paper Kisses: A True Love Story) by Reinhard Kaiser, 
 Special prize for Illustration: Binette Schroeder

1996
 Picture book: Feuerland ist viel zu heiß! by Anna Höglund, 
 Children's book: Als die Welt noch jung war (When the World Was New) by Jürg Schubiger (text), Rotraut Susanne Berner (illustration), 
 Youth book: Winterbucht by Mats Wahl, 
 Non-fiction book: Rot, Blau und ein bißchen Gelb by Bjørn Sortland (text), Lars Elling (illustration), 
 Special prize for Writing: Paul Maar

1995
 Picture book: Detektiv John Chatterton (Detective John Chatterton) by Yvan Pommaux, 
 Children's book: Wenn das Glück kommt, muß man ihm einen Stuhl hinstellen by Mirjam Pressler, 
 Youth book: Du fehlst mir, du fehlst mir! (I miss you, I miss you!) by Peter Pohl / Kinna Gieth, 
 Non-fiction book: Die Zeit ist kaputt by Klaus Kordon, 
 Special prize for Illustration: Klaus Ensikat

1994
 Picture book: Macker by David Hughes
 Children's book: Kannst du pfeifen Johanna? (Can You Whistle Johanna?) by Ulf Stark (text), Anna Höglund (illustration), 
 Youth book: Sofies Welt (Sophie's World) by Jostein Gaarder, 
 Non-fiction book: Anne Frank by Ruud vaan der Rol / Rian Verhoeven, 
 Special prize for Translation: Mirjam Pressler

1993
 Picture book: Das Bärenwunder (The Miracle of the Bears) by Wolf Erlbruch, 
 Children's book: Der Hund, der unterwegs zum Stern war (A Bridge to the Stars) by Henning Mankell, 
 Youth book: Jack by A. M. Homes, 
 Non-fiction book: Safari ins Reich der Sterne by Helmut Hornung, 
 Special prize for Lyric Poetry: Josef Guggenmos

1992
 Picture book: Die Reise nach Ugri-La-Brek by Thomas Tidholm (text), Anna-Clara Tidholm (illustration), 
 Children's book: Siebenstorch by Benno Pludra (text), Johannes K.G. Niedlich (illustration), 
 Youth book: Kariuki und sein weißer Freund (Little White Man) by Meja Mwangi, 
 Non-fiction book: Linsen, Lupen und magische Skope by Pelle Eckerman (text), Sven Nordqvist (illustration), 

1991
 Picture book: eins, fünf, viele (One, Five, Many) by Kveta Pacovská, 
 Children's book: Taube Klara by Wolf Spillner, 
 Youth book: Wir Kuckuckskinder by Anatoli Pristawkin, 
 Non-fiction book: Die eiserne Lerche by Michail Krausnick, 
 Special prize for Writing: Ursula Wölfel

1990
 Picture book: Aufstand der Tiere oder die Neuen Stadtmusikanten by Jörg Steiner (text), Jörg Müller (illustration), 
 Children's book: Rennschwein Rudi Rüssel by Uwe Timm (text), Gunnar Matysiak (illustration), 
 Youth book: Jan, mein Freund (Johnny, My Friend) by Peter Pohl, 
 Non-fiction book: Wie kommt der Wald ins Buch? by Irmgard Lucht, 
 Non-fiction book: Meines Bruders Hüter (My Brother's Keeper: The Holocaust Through the Eyes of an Artist) by Israel Bernbaum,

1980–1989

1989
 Picture book: Papa wohnt jetzt in der Heinrichstraße by Nele Maar (text), Verena Ballhaus (illustration), 
 Children's book: Die Zeit der geheimen Wünsche by Iva Procházková (text), Peter Knorr (illustration), 
 Youth book: Zeit für die Hora by Ingeborg Bayer, 
 Youth book: Samuel Tillerman, der Läufer (The Runner) by Cynthia Voigt,  

1988
 Picture book: Abschied von Rune (Goodbye Rune) by Marit Kaldhol (text), Wenche Øyen (illustration), 
 Children's book: Deesje macht das schon by Joke van Leeuwen, 
 Youth book: Die Wolke by Gudrun Pausewang, 
 Non-fiction book: Linnéa im Garten des Malers by Christina Björk (text), Lena Anderson (illustration), 
 Non-fiction book: Türme by Paul Maar, 

1987
 Picture book: Du hast angefangen! Nein, du! (Two Monsters) by David McKee, 
 Children's book: Oma und ich by Achim Bröger, 
 Youth book: Briefe an die Königin der Nacht by Inger Edelfeldt, 

1986
 Picture book: Ich komm dich holen! (I'm coming to get you!) by Tony Ross, 
 Children's book: Die wundersame Reise der kleinen Sofie (Little Sophie and Lanky Flop) by Els Pelgrom, 
 Youth book: Lady Punk by Dagmar Chidolue, 
 Non-fiction book: Für fremde Kaiser und kein Vaterland by Klas Ewert Everwyn, 

1985
 Picture book: Mein Papi, nur meiner!(The Visitors Who Came to Stay) by Anthony Browne / Annalena MacAfee, 
 Children's book: Sophiechen und der Riese (The BFG) by Roald Dahl, 
 Youth book: Treffpunkt Weltzeituhr by Isolde Heyne, 

1984
 Picture book: Mäusemärchen – Riesengeschichte (Giant Story/Mouse Tale) by Annegert Fuchshuber, 
 Children's book: Sonntagskind (Sunday's Child) by Gudrun Mebs, 
 Youth book: In dreihundert Jahren vielleicht by Tilman Röhrig, 

1983
 Children's book: Der Weg durch die Wand by Robert Gernhardt/ Almut Gernhardt, 
 Youth book: Ganesh oder eine neue Welt (Ganesh) by Malcolm J. Bosse, 

1982
 Picture book: Selina, Pumpernickel und die Katze Flora (Selina, the Mouse and the Giant Cat) by Susi Bohdal, 
 Children's book: Erzähl mir von Oma by Guus Kuijer, 
 Youth book: Der gelbe Vogel by Myron Levoy, 
 Non-fiction book: Von feinen und von kleinen Leuten by Cornelia Julius, 

1981
 Picture book: Die Reise mit der Jolle by Margaret Rettich, 
 Children's book: Drunter und drüber by Jürgen Spohn, 
 Youth book: Der lange Weg des Lukas B. by Willi Fährmann, 
 Non-fiction book: Das kurze Leben der Sophie Scholl (The short life of Sophie Scholl) by Hermann Vinke, 

1980
 Picture book: Was ist dir lieber ... (Would you rather?) by John Burningham, 
 Children's book: Emma oder die unruhige Zeit by Ursula Fuchs, 
 Youth book: Johanna by Renate Welsh,

1970–1979

1979
 Picture book: Oh, wie schön ist Panama (The Trip to Panama) by Janosch, 
 Children's book: Die Nachtvögel by Tormud Haugen, 

1978
 Picture book: Der große Rutsch by Ray and Catriona Smith, 
 Children's book: Servus Opa, sagte ich leise by Elfie Donnelly, 
 Youth book: Der Bleisiegelfälscher by Dietlof Reiche, 
 Non-fiction book: Nest am Fenster (Window into a Nest) by Geraldine L. Flanagan, 

1977
 Picture book: Schorschi schrumpft (The Shrinking of Treehorn) by Edward Gorey / Florence P. Heide, 
 Children's book: Wo die Füchse Blockflöte spielen by Ludvík Aškenazy, 
 Youth book: Ich bin Fedde by An Rutgers, 
 Non-fiction book: Eskimos by Wally Herbert, 

1976
 Picture book: Heute wünsche ich mir ein Nilpferd by Wilhelm Schlote, 
 Children's book: Oma by Peter Härtling, 
 Youth book: Die Wächter (The Guardians) by John Christopher, 
 Non-fiction book: Planet des Menschen by Theodor Dolezol, 

1975
 Picture book: Wir können noch viel zusammen machen by F. K. Waechter, 
 Youth book: Julie von den Wölfen (Julie of the Wolves) by Jean Craighead George, 
 Non-fiction book: Sie bauten eine Kathedrale (Cathedral: The Story of its Construction) by David Macaulay, 

1974
 Picture book: Alle Jahre wieder saust der Preßlufthammer nieder by Jörg Müller, 
 Children's book: Als Hitler das rosa Kaninchen stahl (When Hitler Stole Pink Rabbit) by Judith Kerr, 
 Youth book: Momo by Michael Ende, 
 Non-fiction book: Tausend Tricks der Tarnung (Animal camouflage) by Otto von Frisch, 

1973
 Picture book: Große dürfen alles (If I were a Grown-up) by László Réber/ Éva Janikovszky, 
 Children's book: Wir pfeifen auf den Gurkenkönig (The Cucumber King) by Christine Nöstlinger, 
 Youth book: Ein nützliches Mitglied der Gesellschaft (Run softly, go fast) by Barbara Wersba, 
 Non-fiction book: Ich habe sieben Leben by Frederik Hetmann, 

1972
 Children's book: Geh und spiel mit dem Riesen by Hans-Joachim Gelberg (Published), 
 Youth book: Krabat (The Satanic Mill) by Otfried Preußler, 
 Non-fiction book: Höhlen – Welt ohne Sonne (Mysterious World of Caves) by Ernst W. Bauer, 

1971
 Picture book: Der Apfel und der Schmetterling (The Apple and the Butterfly) by Iela and Enzo Mari, 
 Children's book: Der Löwe Leopold by Reiner Kunze, 
 Youth book: Die Erde ist nah (The Earth is Near) by Ludek Pesek, 
 Non-fiction book: Gesellschaft und Staat by Hanno Drechsler (Published), 

1970
 Picture book: Kunterbunter Schabernack by Wilfried Blecher, 
 Youth book: Der Bruder des schweigenden Wolfes by Klára Jarunková, 
 Non-fiction book: Der Mann, der überlebte (George Washington Carver: the man who overcame) by Lawrence Elliott,

1960–1969

1969
 Picture book: Rundherum in meiner Stadt (Round and Round in my Town) by Ali Mitgutsch, 
 Children's book: Zlateh, die Geiß und andere Geschichten (Zlateh the Goat and Other Stories) by Isaac B. Singer, 
 Youth book: Es lebe die Republik (Long live the Republic; All about me, and Julie, and the end of the Great War) by Jan Procházka, 

1968
 Picture book: Die Wichtelmänner (The Elves and the Shoemaker) by Katrin Brandt, 
 Children's book: Die Zwölf vom Dachboden (The Twelve and the Genii) by Pauline Clarke, 
 Youth book: Der Sohn des Toreros (The Shadow of the Bull) by Maia Rodman, 
 Non-fiction book: ... und unter uns die Erde by Erich H. Heimann, 

1967
 Picture book: Der goldene Vogel (The Golden Bird) by / Jacob Grimm, 
 Children's book: Achtung – Sturmwarnung Hurricane (Hurricane) by Andrew Salkey, 
 Youth book: Im roten Hinterhaus by Peter Berger, 
 Non-fiction book: Das Rätsel Nordwestpassage by Kurt Lütgen, 

1966
 Picture book: Wo ist Wendelin? (Where is Peterkin) by Wilfried Blecher, 
 Children's book: David by Max Bolliger, 
 Youth book: Florian 14: Achter Alarm by Hans G. Prager, 

1965
 Picture book: Swimmy by Leo Lionni, 
 Children's book: Wickie und die starken Männer (Vicky the Viking) by Runer Jonsson, 
 Youth book: Amerika-Saga by Frederik Hetmann, 

1964
 Children's book: Delphinensommer (Golden Island) by Katherine Allfrey, 
 Youth book: ... und viele Grüße von Wancho by Miep Diekmann, 

1963
 Children's book: Kater Mikesch (Purrkin, the talking cat) by Josef Lada, 
 Youth book: Insel der blauen Delphine (Island of the Blue Dolphins) by Scott O'Dell, 

1962
 Children's book: Feuerschuh und Windsandale (Tim Fireshoe) by Ursula Wölfel, 
 Youth book: Sternkinder (Star children) by Clara Asscher-Pinkhof, 

1961
 Children's book: Jim Knopf und Lukas der Lokomotivführer (Jim Button and Luke the Engine Driver) by Michael Ende, 

1960
 Children's book: Mein Urgroßvater und ich (My Great Grandfather and I) by James Krüss, 
 Youth book: Schanghai 41 (To Beat a Tiger) by Elizabeth F. Lewis

1956–1959

1959
 Children's book: Matthias und das Eichhörnchen (Magnus and the squirrel) by Hans Peterson, 
 Special prize: Latte Igel und der Wasserstein by Sebastian Lybeck, 

1958
 Picture book: Kasimirs Weltreise by Marlene Reidel, 
 Children's book: Jan und das Wildpferd (Jan and the Wild Horse) by Heinrich M. Denneborg, 
 Youth book: Roter Mond und Heiße Zeit (Red Moon and High Summer) by Herbert Kaufmann, 

1957
 Children's book: Das Rad auf der Schule (The Wheel on the School) by Meindert DeJong, 
 Youth book: Faß zu, Toyon (Toyon, a dog of the North and his people) by Nicholas Kalashnikoff, 
 Non-fiction book: Pioniere und ihre Enkel (Children on the Oregon Trail) by An Rutgers, 

1956
 Children's book: Der glückliche Löwe (Happy Lion) by Roger Duvoisin/Louise Fatio, 
 Youth book: Kein Winter für Wölfe (Two Against the Arctic: Story of a Restless Life between Greenland and Alaska) by Kurt Lütgen, 
 Children's book: Mio, mein Mio (Mio, My Son) by Astrid Lindgren,

References

External links
 The Deutscher Jugendliteraturpreis website (in German)
 The Deutscher Jugendliteraturpreis website (English key facts)
AKJ website (in German)

Children's literary awards
German literary awards
Awards established in 1956
1956 establishments in West Germany